Minuscule 382 (in the Gregory-Aland numbering), ε 300 (Soden), is a Greek minuscule manuscript of the New Testament, on parchment. Palaeographically it has been assigned to the 11th century. 
The manuscript is lacunose. It contains marginalia.

Description 

The codex contains the text of the Gospel of Luke on 167 parchment leaves with numerous lacunae. The text is written in two columns per page, in 24 lines per page.

There is also a division according to the smaller Ammonian Sections, but without references to the Eusebian Canons.

It was carelessly written.

The fragments of John and Luke are placed by the binder before Matthew and Mark.

Text 

Hermann von Soden included the text of the codex in the textual family K1. Aland did not place it in any of his Categories. According to the Claremont Profile Method its text in Luke 1; 10; 20 is mixed.

History 

The manuscript was written in Calabria. The manuscript was added to the list of New Testament manuscripts by Scholz (1794–1852). 
C. R. Gregory saw it in 1886.

The manuscript is currently housed at the Vatican Library (Vat. gr. 2070) in Rome.

See also 

 List of New Testament minuscules
 Biblical manuscript
 Textual criticism

References

Further reading

External links 

 

Greek New Testament minuscules
11th-century biblical manuscripts
Manuscripts of the Vatican Library